Savina is the name of following Serbian Orthodox monasteries:

Savina Monastery (Serbia), cave monastery in southern Serbia
Savina Monastery (Montenegro)